I Canadian Corps was one of the two corps fielded by the Canadian Army during the Second World War.

History
From December 24, 1940, until the formation of the First Canadian Army in April 1942, there was a single unnumbered Canadian Corps. I Canadian Corps became operational in Italy in November 1943 when the 5th Canadian (Armoured) Division joined the 1st Canadian Infantry Division, which had been assigned to the British Eighth Army immediately prior to the Allied invasion of Sicily in July 1943. I Canadian Corps was commanded successively by Lieutenant-General Harry Crerar (April 6, 1942, to March 19, 1944), Lieutenant-General Eedson Burns (March 20 to November 5, 1944), and Lieutenant-General Charles Foulkes (November 10, 1944, to July 17, 1945).

However, the 1st Canadian Infantry Division took part in the Italian Campaign, participating in the Moro River Campaign and the Battle of Ortona in December 1943 as part of British V Corps and it was not until the fourth Battle of Monte Cassino (Operation Diadem) in May 1944 that I Canadian Corps fought its first battle as a corps. The Eighth Army held the corps in reserve until after the Gustav defences in the Liri valley had been broken and then brought it forward to assault successfully the next defensive line, the Hitler Line, shortly before the Allied capture of Rome in early June. Having taken part in the Allies' northward advance to Florence, the corps then took part in Operation Olive, the assault on the Gothic Line, in September 1944 before being transported during January–February 1945 in Operation Goldflake to rejoin the rest of the First Canadian Army in Belgium and the Netherlands.  There the corps participated in the campaign to complete the liberation of the Netherlands.  On May 6, 1945, at Wageningen, Lieutenant-General Foulkes received the final surrender by Colonel General Johannes Blaskowitz of all remaining German forces still active in the Netherlands. The corps was deactivated on July 17, 1945, as part of general demobilization.

Although nominally a Canadian formation, I Canadian Corps contained significant elements at different times from other Allied countries.  For example, in Italy, during the assault on the Gothic Line in the Fall of 1944, the corps included the British 4th Infantry Division, the 2nd New Zealand Division and the 3rd Greek Mountain Brigade. During the final campaign to liberate the Netherlands, the corps included for a time the British 49th Infantry Division.

21st century
In 2015, personnel of the Canadian Army Doctrine and Training Centre, headquartered at CFB Kingston, began wearing the formation patch of I Canadian Corps on their ceremonial and service dress uniforms.

Major operations

Operation Timberwolf, December 1943
Operation Morning Glory, December 1943
Operation Diadem, Liri Valley Offensive, May 1944
Operation Olive, assault on the Gothic Line, September 1944
Operation Goldflake, transport from Italy to the Netherlands, February–March 1945
Operation Destroyer, advance from Nijmegen to Arnhem, April 1945
Advance to Harderwijk on the coast of the IJsselmeer, April 1945
Liberation of the Netherlands, March–May 1945
Lieutenant-General Foulkes receives the surrender of all German forces in the Netherlands, May 5, 1945
Security duties, delivery of relief supplies and infrastructure repair projects in the Netherlands, May–July, 1945

Order of Battle in Italy, 1944-45
1st Canadian Infantry Division
5th Canadian Armoured Division
1st Canadian Armoured Brigade
Corps Troops
I Corps Defence Company, Lorne Scots
1st Armoured Car Regiment (Royal Canadian Dragoons) 
7th Anti-Tank Regiment, Royal Canadian Artillery (RCA)
1st Survey Regiment, RCA
9th Field Park Company, Royal Canadian Engineers (RCE)
12th Field Company, RCE
13th Field Company, RCE
14th Field Company, RCE
1st Drilling Company, RCE
I Canadian Corps Headquarters Signals, Royal Canadian Corps of Signals
No. 31 Corps Troops Company, Royal Canadian Army Service Corps (RCASC)
No. 32 Corps Troops Company, RCASC
I Canadian Corps Transport Company, RCASC
No. 1 Motor Ambulance Company, RCASC
No. 1 Headquarters Corps Car Company, RCASC
Nos. 4 & 5 Casualty Clearing Stations, Royal Canadian Army Medical Corps (RCAMC)
No. 8 Field Dressing Section, RCAMC
No. 5 Field Hygiene Section, RCAMC
Nos. 1, 3 & 8 Dental Companies, Canadian Dental Corps (CDC)
No. 11 Base Dental Company, CDC
No. 1 Corps and Army Troops Sub-Park, Royal Canadian Ordnance Corps (RCOC)
I Corps Troops Workshop, Royal Canadian Electrical and Mechanical Engineers (RCEME)
No. 1 Recovery Company, RCEME
No. 3 Provost Company, Canadian Provost Corps (C Pro C)
Attached First Canadian Army Troops
No. 1 Army Group Royal Canadian Artillery
11th Army Field Regiment, RCA
1st Medium Regiment, RCA
2nd Medium Regiment, RCA
5th Medium Regiment, RCA
No. 41 Army Transport Company, RCASC
"H" Squadron, 25th Canadian Armoured Delivery Regiment (The Elgin Regiment), Canadian Armoured Corps
Nos. 1, 2 & 3 Field Transfusion Units, RCAMC
Nos. 3 & 16 Field Dressing Stations, RCAMC
Nos. 1, 3, 5, 14, 15 & 28 General Hospitals, RCAMC
No. 1 Convalescent Depot, RCAMC
Nos. 1, 2 & 3 Field Surgical Units, RCAMC

Commanders
These officers commanded the I Canadian Corps:
Lieutenant-General Andrew G. L. McNaughton, (July 19, 1940, to April 5, 1942)
Lieutenant-General Harry Crerar (April 8, 1942, to March 19, 1944)
Lieutenant-General Eedson Burns (March 20 to November 5, 1944)
Lieutenant-General Charles Foulkes (November 10, 1944, to July 17, 1945)

See also
Moro River Campaign
Battle of Ortona
Battle of Monte Cassino
Gothic Line

References
Byers, A. R. (ed.), The Canadians at War 1939/45, 2nd ed., The Reader's Digest Association (Canada) Ltd., Montreal, Canada, 1986, .
Copp, Terry, Cinderella  Army: The Canadians in Northwest Europe 1944-1945, University of Toronto Press, Toronto, Canada, 2007, .

Notes

External links
I Canadian Corps at canadiansoldiers.com

Military units and formations of Canada in World War II
Military units and formations established in 1943
Canadian World War II corps
Military units and formations of the British Empire in World War II
Military units and formations disestablished in 1945